This is a list of freshwater ecoregions in Latin America and the Caribbean, as identified by the World Wildlife Fund (WWF).

The WWF divides the Earth's land surface into ecoregions, defined as "large area[s] of land or water containing a distinct assemblage of natural communities and species". Ecoregions are grouped into complexes and bioregions, defined as, "a complex of ecoregions that share a similar biogeographic history, and thus often have strong affinities at higher taxonomic levels (e.g. genera, families)." The Earth's land surface is divided into eight biogeographic realms. Latin America corresponds, roughly, to the Neotropical realm, although northern Mexico lies within the Nearctic.

Each ecoregion is also classified into major habitat types, or biomes.

Many consider this classification to be quite decisive, and some propose these as stable borders for bioregional democracy initiatives.

By complex

Baja California Complex

 Baja California (Mexico)

Colorado River Complex

 Colorado Delta (Mexico)
 Sonoran (Mexico)

Sinaloan Coastal Complex

 Sinaloan Coastal (Mexico)

Rio Bravo Complex

 Río Bravo (Mexico, United States)
 Pecos (United States)
 Guzman (Mexico, United States)
 Mapimí (Mexico)
 Cuatro Ciénegas (Mexico)
 Llanos El Salado (Mexico)
 Conchos (Mexico)
 Lower Rio Bravo (Mexico)
 Rio San Juan (Mexico)
 Rio Salado (Mexico)

Lerma/Santiago Complex

 Santiago (Mexico)
 Chapala (Mexico)
 Lerma (Mexico)
 Rio Verde Headwaters (Mexico)
 Manantlan/Ameca (Mexico)

Rio Panuco Complex

 Rio Panuco (Mexico)

Balsas Complex

 Balsas (Mexico)

Pacific Central Complex

 Tehuantepec (Costa Rica, El Salvador, Guatemala, Honduras, Mexico, Nicaragua)

Atlantic Central Complex

 Southern Veracruz (Mexico)
 Belizean Lowlands (Belize, Guatemala, Mexico)
 Central American Caribbean Lowlands (Honduras, Nicaragua)
 Talamancan Highlands (Costa Rica, Panama)
 Catemaco (Mexico)
 Coatzacoalcos (Mexico)
 Grijalva-Usumacinta (Guatemala, Mexico)
 Yucatán (Mexico)
 Guatemalan Highlands (Guatemala)
 Central American Karst Highlands (Belize, Guatemala)
 Honduran/Nicaraguan Highlands (Honduras, Nicaragua)
 Lake Nicaragua (Costa Rica, Nicaragua)

Isthmus Atlantic Complex

 Isthmus Atlantic (Panama)

Isthmus Pacific Complex

 Isthmus Pacific (Costa Rica, Panama)

Bahama Archipelago Complex

Bahamas (Bahamas, Turks and Caicos Islands)

Western Insular Caribbean Complex

 Cuba (Cuba)
 Hispaniola (Dominican Republic, Haiti)
 Jamaica (Jamaica)
 Cayman Islands (Cayman Islands)
 Florida Keys (United States)

Eastern Insular Caribbean Complex

 Puerto Rico and Virgin Islands (British Virgin Islands, Puerto Rico, US Virgin Islands)
 Windward and Leeward Islands (Anguilla, Antigua and Barbuda, Barbados, Dominica, Grenada, Guadeloupe, Martinique, Montserrat, Saba, Saint Barthélemy, Saint Kitts and Nevis, Saint Lucia, Saint Martin, Saint Vincent and the Grenadines, Sint Eustatius)

Choco Complex

 Choco (Colombia, Ecuador, Panama)

South American Caribbean Complex

 Magdalena (Colombia)
 Momposina Depression-Rio Cesar (Colombia)
 Cienega Grande de Santa Marta (Colombia)
 Guajira Desert (Colombia, Venezuela)
 Maracaibo Basin (Venezuela)

High Andean Complex

 Páramos (Colombia, Ecuador, Peru, Venezuela)
 Peru High Andean Complex (Bolivia, Peru)
 Bolivian High Andean Complex (Argentina, Bolivia, Chile)
 Arid Puna (Argentina, Bolivia, Chile, Peru)
 Subandean Pampas (Argentina, Bolivia)
 South Andean Yungas (Argentina, Bolivia)

Inter-Andean Dry Valleys Complex

 Inter-Andean Dry Valleys (Argentina, Bolivia, Colombia, Ecuador, Peru)

North Andean Montane Complex

 North Andean Montane (Colombia, Ecuador, Peru, Venezuela)
 Humid Andean Yungas (Bolivia, Peru)
 Chuquisaca and Tarija Yungas (Bolivia)
 Salta and Tucuman Yungas (Argentina)
 Sierra de Córdoba (Argentina)

Puyango-Tumbes Complex

 Puyango-Tumbes (Ecuador, Peru)

Atacama/Sechura Complex

 Atacama/Sechura Deserts (Chile, Peru)

Pacific Coastal Desert Complex

 Pacific Coastal Deserts (Peru, Chile)

Lake Titicaca/Poopo Complex

 Lake Titicaca (Bolivia, Peru)
 Lake Poopo (Bolivia)

Galápagos Complex

 Galápagos (Ecuador)

Mediterranean Chile Complex

 North Mediterranean Chile (Chile)
 South Mediterranean Chile (Chile)

Juan Fernández Islands Complex

 Juan Fernández Islands (Chile)

Southern Chile Complex

 Valdivian (Chile)
 Chiloe Island (Chile)
 Chonos Archipelago (Chile)
 Magallanes/Ultima Esperanza (Chile)

Subantarctic Complex

 Subantarctic (Falkland Islands)

Venezuelan Coast/Trinidad Complex

 Venezuelan Coast/Trinidad (Trinidad and Tobago, Venezuela)
 Caroni Swamp (Trinidad and Tobago)
 Nariva Swamp (Trinidad and Tobago)

Llanos Complex

 Llanos (Colombia, Venezuela)

Guiana/Orinoco Complex

 Eastern Morichal (Venezuela)
 Orinoco Delta (Venezuela)
 Southern Orinoco (Venezuela)
 Guiana Watershed (Brazil, French Guiana, Guyana, Suriname, Venezuela)

Amazon Complex

 Amazon Delta (Brazil)
 Amazon Main Channel (Brazil, Peru)
 Northern Amazon Shield Tributaries (Brazil)
 Rio Negro (Brazil, Colombia, Venezuela)
 Upper Amazon Piedmont (Bolivia, Colombia, Ecuador, Peru)
 Western Amazon Lowlands (Bolivia, Brazil, Peru)
 Central Brazilian Shield Tributaries (Bolivia, Brazil)
 Tocantins-Araguaia (Brazil)

Northeast Atlantic Complex

 Maranhao (Brazil)

Mata-Atlantica Complex

 Northeast Mata-Atlantica (Brazil)
 East Mata-Atlantica (Brazil)
 Southeast Mata-Atlantica (Brazil)

São Francisco Complex

 Caatinga (Brazil)
 Cerrado (Brazil)

Upper Parana Complex

 Upper Parana (Brazil)

Beni Complex

 Beni (Bolivia)

Paraguay-Parana Complex

 Pantanal (Bolivia, Brazil, Paraguay)
 Lower Parana (Argentina, Brazil, Paraguay, Uruguay)

Southern Atlantic Complex

 Jacui Highlands (Brazil, Uruguay)
 Lagoa dos Patos Coastal Plain (Brazil, Uruguay)

Chaco Complex

 Chaco (Argentina, Bolivia, Paraguay)

Pampas Complex

 Parana-Platense Basin (Argentina)
 Rio Salado and Arroyo Vallimanca Basin (Argentina)
 Northwest Pampas Basins (Argentina)
 Pampas Coastal Plains (Argentina)
 Southwest Pampas Basins (Argentina)

Patagonia Complex

 Rio Colorado (Argentina)
 Rio Limay-Neuquen-Rio Negro (Argentina)
 Meseta Somuncura (Argentina)
 Rio Chubut-Rio Chico (Argentina)
 Rio Deseado (Argentina)
 Rio Santa Cruz-Rio Chico (Argentina)
 Rio Coyle (Argentina)
 Rio Gallegos (Argentina)
 Tierra del Fuego-Rio Grande (Argentina, Chile)

By major habitat type

Large rivers
 Amazon Main Channel (Brazil, Peru)
 Río Bravo (Mexico, United States)
 Central Brazilian Shield Tributaries (Bolivia, Brazil)
 Eastern Morichal (Venezuela)
 Guiana Watershed (Brazil, French Guiana, Guyana, Suriname, Venezuela)
 Lower Rio Bravo (Mexico)
 Rio Negro (Brazil, Colombia, Venezuela)
 Northern Amazon Shield Tributaries (Brazil)
 Upper Parana (Brazil)
 Lower Parana (Argentina, Brazil, Paraguay, Uruguay)
 Tocantins-Araguaia (Brazil)
 Southern Orinoco (Venezuela)
 Upper Amazon Piedmont (Bolivia, Colombia, Ecuador, Peru)
 Western Amazon Lowlands (Bolivia, Brazil, Peru)

Large river deltas
 Amazon Delta (Brazil)
 Colorado Delta (Mexico)
 Orinoco Delta (Venezuela)
 Parano-Platense Basin (Argentina)

Montane rivers and streams
 Bolivian High Andean Complex (Argentina, Bolivia, Chile)
 Chuquisaca and Tarija Yungas (Bolivia)
 Humid Andean Yungas (Bolivia, Peru)
 Inter-Andean Dry Valleys (Argentina, Bolivia, Colombia, Ecuador, Peru)
 North Andean Montane (Colombia, Ecuador, Peru, Venezuela)
 Peru High Andean Complex (Bolivia, Peru)
 Salta and Tucuman Yungas (Argentina)
 Sierra de Córdoba (Argentina)
 South Andean Yungas (Argentina, Bolivia)
 Talamancan Highlands (Costa Rica, Panama)

Wet-Region rivers and streams
 Bahamas (Bahamas, Turks and Caicos Islands)
 Balsas (Mexico)
 Belizean Lowlands (Belize, Guatemala, Mexico)
 Cayman Islands (Cayman Islands)
 Central American Caribbean Lowlands (Honduras, Nicaragua)
 Central American Karst Highlands (Belize, Guatemala)
 Cerrado (Brazil)
 Chaco (Argentina, Bolivia, Paraguay)
 Chiloe Island (Chile)
 Choco (Colombia, Ecuador, Panama)
 Chonos Archipelago (Chile)
 Rio Chubut-Rio Chico (Argentina)
 Cienega Grande de Santa Marta (Colombia)
 Coatzacoalcos (Mexico)
 Rio Colorado (Argentina)
 Rio Coyle (Argentina)
 Cuba (Cuba)
 Rio Deseado (Argentina)
 East Mata-Atlantica (Brazil)
 Florida Keys (United States)
 Rio Gallegos (Argentina)
 Grijalva-Usumacinta (Guatemala, Mexico)
 Hispaniola (Dominican Republic, Haiti)
 Honduran/Nicaraguan Highlands (Honduras, Nicaragua)
 Isthmus Atlantic (Panama)
 Isthmus Pacific (Costa Rica, Panama)
 Jacui Highlands (Brazil, Uruguay)
 Jamaica (Jamaica)
 Juan Fernández Islands (Chile)
 Lagoa dos Patos Coastal Plain (Brazil, Uruguay)
 Rio Limay-Neuquen-Rio Negro (Argentina)
 Magdalena (Colombia)
 Manantlan/Ameca (Mexico)
 Maracaibo Basin (Venezuela)
 Maranhao (Brazil)
 Momposina Depression-Rio Cesar (Colombia)
 Rio Panuco (Mexico)
 Puerto Rico and Virgin Islands (British Virgin Islands, Puerto Rico, US Virgin Islands)
 Puyango-Tumbes (Ecuador, Peru)
 Rio Santa Cruz-Rio Chico (Argentina)
 Santiago (Mexico)
 Sinaloan Coastal (Mexico)
 Southeast Mata-Atlantica (Brazil)
 Southern Veracruz (Mexico)
 Tehuantepec (Costa Rica, El Salvador, Guatemala, Honduras, Mexico, Nicaragua)
 Tierra del Fuego-Rio Grande (Argentina, Chile)
 Valdivian (Chile)
 Venezuelan Coast/Trinidad (Trinidad and Tobago, Venezuela)
 Windward and Leeward Islands (Anguilla, Antigua and Barbuda, Barbados, Dominica, Grenada, Guadeloupe, Martinique, Montserrat, Saba, Saint Barthélemy, Saint Kitts and Nevis, Saint Lucia, Saint Martin, Saint Vincent and the Grenadines, Sint Eustatius)
 Yucatán (Mexico)

Xeric-Region rivers and streams
 Atacama/Sechura Deserts (Chile, Peru)
 Baja California (Mexico)
 Caatinga (Brazil)
 Chapala (Mexico)
 Conchos (Mexico)
 Galápagos (Ecuador)
 Guajira Desert (Colombia, Venezuela)
 North Mediterranean Chile (Chile)
 Northeast Mata-Atlantica (Brazil)
 Pacific Coastal Deserts (Peru, Chile)
 Pecos (United States)
 Rio Salado (Mexico)
 Rio San Juan (Mexico)
 Sonoran (Mexico)
 South Mediterranean Chile (Chile)
 Rio Verde Headwaters (Mexico)

Xeric-Region endorheic (closed) basins
 Arid Puna (Argentina, Bolivia, Chile, Peru)
 Cuatro Ciénegas (Mexico)
 Guzman (Mexico, United States)
 Lerma (Mexico)
 Llanos El Salado (Mexico)
 Mapimí (Mexico)
 Meseta Somuncura (Argentina)
 Northwest Pampas Basins (Argentina)
 Southwest Pampas Basins (Argentina)
 Subandean Pampas (Argentina, Bolivia)

Flooded grasslands and savannas
 Beni (Bolivia)
 Llanos (Colombia, Venezuela)
 Pampas Coastal Plains (Argentina)
 Pantanal (Bolivia, Brazil, Paraguay)
 Rio Salado and Arroyo Vallimanca Basin (Argentina)

Cold streams, bogs, swamps, and mires
 Magallanes/Ultima Esperanza (Argentina, Chile)
 Páramos (Colombia, Ecuador, Peru, Venezuela)
 Subantarctic (Falkland Islands)

Large lakes
 Catemaco (Mexico)
 Guatemalan Highlands (Guatemala)
 Lake Nicaragua (Costa Rica, Nicaragua)
 Lake Poopo (Bolivia)
 Lake Titicaca (Bolivia, Peru)

References
 Olson, D., Dinerstein, E., Canevari, P., Davidson, I., Castro, G., Morisset, V., Abell, R., and Toledo, E.; eds. (1998). Freshwater biodiversity of Latin America and the Caribbean: A conservation assessment. Biodiversity Support Program, Washington, D.C..

 
.
.
.
.
Freshwater Americas
Ecoregions, Freshwater
Ecoregions, Freshwater
Ecoregions, Freshwater
Ecoregions, Freshwater
Ecoregions, Freshwater
Freshwater
Freshwater
Freshwater
.Freshwater
Latin America and the Caribbean